Viktoriia Paziuk (born 11 February 1985 in Ivano-Frankivsk Oblast, Ukraine) is a Ukrainian basketball player for the Ukrainian national team. During her professional career, she has played for various Ukrainian teams. In the 2022/23 season, she was in the squad of the Team of Poltava Oblast.

Paziuk played only on few occasions for the national team. She became more prominent as a 3x3 basketball player. Paziuk competed for the national 3x3 team at the inaugural European Championships in 2014. Paziuk is a 2015 European Games silver medallist.

References

1986 births
Living people
Basketball players at the 2015 European Games
European Games medalists in basketball
European Games silver medalists for Ukraine
People from Ivano-Frankivsk Oblast
Ukrainian women's basketball players
21st-century Ukrainian women